Neogenin is a protein that in humans is encoded by the NEO1 gene.

Interactions 

NEO1 has been shown to interact with PTK2. Also Neogenin receptor is pointed as a component of the mechanisms that determine skeletal cell fusion via RGMa (repulsive guidance molecule a) binding.

References

Further reading 

 
 
 
 
 
 
 
 
 
 

Human proteins